"Square peg in a round hole" is an idiomatic expression which describes the unusual
individualist who could not fit into a niche of their society.

The metaphor was originated by Sydney Smith in "On the Conduct of the Understanding", one of a series of lectures on moral philosophy that he delivered at the Royal Institution in 1804–06:

The Oxford English Dictionary has as its earliest citation Albany Fonblanque, England under Seven Administrations, 1837, "Sir Robert Peel was a smooth round peg, in a sharp-cornered square hole, and Lord Lyndenurst is a rectangular square-cut peg, in a smooth round hole."

English literature
The British novelist Edward Bulwer-Lytton published the metaphor in a late 19th-century book:

Music
"A Square Peg in a Round Hole" is the title song of the 1959 British war comedy film The Square Peg starring Norman Wisdom.
"Square Peg in a Round Hole" is also the name of an album by Apparatjik.

Godley and Creme in their title "Wedding Bells" (1981) are singing:
"I'm like a square peg in a round hole
I don't belong here baby
don't need a fanfare or a drum roll
to tell you baby
I don't belong to you baby"

Business management
This idiomatic expression has proven to be quite durable into the 21st century.  It is used in a range of contemporary business-related circumstances; and illustrative examples include: 
"As they say, you can't fit a square peg in a round hole. If your boss is like that round hole and you are that square peg, you aren't going to fit in unless you re-shape your edges." 
-- Gini Graham Scott in  A Survival Guide for Working with Bad Bosses: Dealing with Bullies, Idiots, Back-stabbers, and Other Managers from Hell (2005).

Visual meaning
The idiomatic expression conjures a visual image, and this is evolving independently, e.g., 
"We intend to show that Israel needs a security process as well as a peace process.... To continue with the old diplomatic approach would be like hammering square pegs into round holes." -- Dore Gold
 "... relating back to the title of the panel session, square peg in a round hole; well, maybe, but sometimes you can force that peg in and make it stick. We seem to be somewhere between a feeling of cautious optimism and open-minded skepticism about the workability of disease management in fee-for-service Medicare. -- Bruce Steinwald, Director of Economics and Payment Issues in the Health Division at the U.S. General Accounting Office

Similar expressions

Sejong the Great of Korea commented, in 1443, that using Chinese characters for Korean was “like trying to fit a square handle into a round hole”. He subsequently developed the Hangul phonetic alphabet.

There is a Chinese idiom "方枘圆凿", or "方凿圆枘", (literally and respectively "square tenon and round mortise" and "square mortise and round tenon") that was originally derived from a line in the Verses of Chu (Chu ci) 楚辭), composed in the Warring States period (ended 221 BC), in which the poet Song Yu writes: "圆凿而方枘兮，吾固知其龃龉而难入。" The Han Dynasty historian Sima Qian and Tang Dynasty historian 司馬貞 used the same expression in their historical writings too. It is still widely used today to mean two things that don't fit together due to different qualities, characters or abilities.

Literal cases
Dutch settlers in northeastern North America sometimes actually pounded square-cut pegs into round holes when building in the 1800s.
 A common method of securing the steel rail of railway track into timber sleepers is to drive a square-cut dogspike into a pre-drilled round hole. 

 During the Apollo 13 space mission, an oxygen tank explosion left the Command Module Odyssey uninhabitable. Using the Lunar Module Aquarius as a lifeboat, the crew evacuated into the lunar module for the rest of the trip to the Moon and back to Earth. Among the problems they had to solve was that the carbon dioxide scrubbers were being used up too quickly, being designed for the requirements of two astronauts for  days, not three astronauts for three for four days. There were unused canisters in the command module, but those were cube-shaped and large, not cylindrical and small as in the lunar module. Ground Control put together a team with the objective to find a way to use only items available on the spacecraft to build something to make the control module canisters usable. Using plastic sample bags and cardboard from the log books covers as a funnel, the cabin air was pumped through the lithium hydroxide using a pressure suit hose, into a fan and then through a sock, which acted as the filter. The whole thing was held together with duct tape.

See also
 Joseph Powell Williams
List of English-language idioms
Procrustean

Notes

References
 Bulwer-Lytton, Edward. (1873).  Kenelm Chillingly, His Adventures and Opinions. London: Routledge. OCLC 220004649
 Scott, Gini Graham, (2005).  A Survival Guide for Working with Bad Bosses: Dealing with Bullies, Idiots, Bback-stabbers, and Other Managers from Hell. New York: AMACOM (American Management Association). 
 Wallace, Irving. (1957)  The Square Pegs: Some Americans Who Dared to be Different.  New York: Knopf. 

English-language idioms